Sibilobilo Safari Area comprises the Sibilobilo Islands in Lake Kariba and is part of the Zimbabwe Parks and Wildlife Estate.

History of the park
The safari area was proclaimed in 1975, prior to which it was a Controlled Hunting Area, since the impoundment of Lake Kariba.

Features

Flora

Fauna

Geography and geology
The Safari Area comprises 13 islands in Lake Kariba, the largest of which are Namembere, Namagwaba and Weather, and 2,130 ha of the Sengwa Peninsular.

The Sibilobilo area is underlain by rocks of the Mesozoic Upper Karoo Group, predominantly sandstones and basalts. Specimens of Vulcanodon karibaensis have been found in the Vulcanodon beds  within the Batoka basalt.

Archaeological, historical and cultural sites

Accommodation and camping
None current or proposed.

Tourism

Access
By boat from Kariba or by motorable track from Bumi Hills.

Concessions
The Sibilobilo Safari Area is divided into two sections A (the islands) and B (the peninsular), which are let under concession to tour operators or for recreational hunting.

See also
 Bumi Hills
 Lake Kariba
 Matusadona National Park

External links
 Parks and Wildlife Management Authority

References

National parks of Zimbabwe
1975 establishments in Rhodesia
Protected areas established in 1975
Geography of Mashonaland West Province